"This Is for You" is an electro-boogie song recorded by American "emotio-electro" band The System. The song, written by Mic Murphy and David Frank, was released in 1985 by Mirage Records. The song is also included in their 1985 album The Pleasure Seekers. The song was mixed by Tom Lord-Alge.

"This Is for You" reached #43 on the Club Play Singles and #8 on  the Black Singles charts. In the United Kingdom, the song reached #78 on UK Singles Chart.

Track listing

1985 releases  
12" vinyl
 US: Mirage / 0-96851

12" vinyl
 UK: Polydor / POSPX 768

Personnel 
 Producer: Mic Murphy, David Frank
 Songwriter: Mic Murphy, David Frank
 Produced by Mic Murphy and David Frank for Science Lab Productions.
 Mixing: Tom Lord-Alge

Chart performance

References 

1985 singles
The System (band) songs
1985 songs
Songs written by Mic Murphy
Mirage Records singles
Polydor Records singles
Songs written by David Frank (musician)